Mont'Kiara International School (M'KIS or MKIS) is an American international school situated on a prime location and 6-acre (2.4 ha) of land in Mont Kiara, in the constituency of Segambut, Kuala Lumpur, Malaysia. The first students enrolled in M'KIS in 1994, and its first senior class graduated in 2001. M’KIS is accredited by the Western Association of Schools and Colleges (WASC) in the United States, and authorized by the International Baccalaureate (IB). It is one of a select group of International Baccalaureate full-continuum world schools in Malaysia. It offers IB programme for Primary Years (PYP), Middle Years (MYP) and the full IB Diploma Programme (IBDP).

The school has strong international student enrollments from more than 55 countries and dynamic teachers from across the globe. Mont'Kiara International School (M'KIS or MKIS) is known for its world-class and engaging curriculum that nurtures academic talents, intellectual curiosity, intercultural understanding and respect, and global awareness.  Mont'Kiara International School (M'KIS or MKIS) is a leading international school in Malaysia that has a rich history of student success, outstanding faculty and supportive parent community.

Facilities 
Mont'Kiara International School (M'KIS or MKIS) contains four major buildings. The Elementary School building (one of the original buildings) houses the Elementary Office and PreK Age 3 to Grade 5 classes. It also houses the Elementary School computer lab and the Library Media Center (LMC)(Renovated in 2018). The Middle School and High School buildings (also one of the original buildings) houses Grades 6 through 12. The Middle School building contains three of the four computer labs, a STEM(New addition in 2017) lab, and a science lab. The High School building contains most of the Middle and High School classes. In the High School building are the MYP Product Design lab, ceramics room, the Middle and High School art room, robotics laboratory, a multipurpose room and three of the four science labs. The Language Department, Admissions Office, Administration Office and theatre are in the fourth building. Also in this building are the language rooms, 2 air-conditioned sports halls, fully equipped gym, dance studios, music rooms, canteen, and activities room. There is also a health office and social spaces such as a parent’s lounge and community lounge. 

On the M'KIS campus there is also a 25m swimming pool, a regulation-size soccer field, an indoor and an outdoor climbing wall, a futsal court, an additional upper field and two courtyards. The school is also advanced in technology with software solutions for students, teachers and parents, intranets, technology hardware, Internet access and a wireless campus network. Additionally, the Elementary, Middle and High School lab, as well as the library are equipped with computers.

Academics 
Mont'Kiara International School (M'KIS or MKIS) is a full-continuum IB World School and fully accredited by the Western Association of Schools and Colleges (WASC).

M’KIS has four distinct yet closely related educational divisions:

• Early Childhood Education (Pre-K3 and Pre-K4)

• Elementary School (Grades Kindergarten to Grade 5)

• Middle School (Grades 6 to 8)

• High School (Grades 9 to 12)

M’KIS offers all High School students a course of study leading to a US High School Program Diploma. The majority of High School students choose the International Baccalaureate (IB) Diploma programme and thus graduate with both an IB Diploma and the M’KIS High School Diploma

Activities 
Mont'Kiara International School (M'KIS or MKIS) hosts the annual Model United Nations conference, MYMUN. It also participates in large high school conferences like KLMUN hosted in Garden International School, THIMUN Singapore and THIMUN Hague. The school is a member of ISAC (International Schools Athletics Conference) and SEASAC (the South East Asia Student Activities Conference). M'KIS has also been the host for several sports tournaments, such as the SEASAC Touch in 2006 and 2009 and tennis in 2008 and 2011. M’KIS hosted the SEASAC Volleyball Div II and SEASAC Softball Div II in 2020/2021. M’KIS boys volleyball team, girls volleyball team and boys football team traveled to Singapore to compete in the SEASAC tournament in 2022 

Interscholastic sports:
Handball (coed)
Aerobics/dance (coed)
Aquatics (coed)
Baseball (boys, girls)
Basketball (B,G)
Badminton (B,G)
Golf
Cross Country
Martial arts (B,G)
Touch rugby (G)
Football (B,G)
Softball (B,G)
Swimming (B,G)
Tennis (B,G)
Track and field (B,G)
Volleyball (B,G)
Wall climbing (B,G)
Cross Country (B,G)

Extra-curricular activities

Service clubs
Computers for Malaysia
GIN Reach Out
MyGo (Malaysian Global Outreach)
CIA (Caring Initiative for Animals)
Homes for Malaysia (EPIC Homes)
HS/MS Helping Hands
Social Justice Club
Green Club
Madeleine Children's Fund (MCF)

Other clubs
HS/MS Model United Nations
Art Club
Book Club
Chess Club
Dance Club
Drama Production
Photography Club
Student Council
Science Club
The Beat (High school newspaper)
TedX
Theatre
Music Ensemble
MS Tech Corps
HS Tech Corps

Honor Societies
National Honor Society
Tri-M Music Honor Society
Math Honor Society (Mu Alpha Theta)
International Thespian Society
National Art Honor Society
National Honor Society for Dance Arts
Languages
French Honor Society (Société Honoraire de Français)
Spanish National Honor Society (Sociedad Honoraria Hispánica)
National Chinese Honor Society

Accreditations 
Mont'Kiara International School (M'KIS or MKIS) is accredited by the International Baccalaureate (IB) and by the Western Association of Schools and Colleges (WASC).

Student enrolment

High School enrolment: 226
Middle School enrolment: 236
Elementary School enrolment: 555
Total enrolment: 1017
Average class size: 18 students
Student/teacher ratio: 9/1

References

International schools in Kuala Lumpur
Secondary schools in Kuala Lumpur
International Baccalaureate schools in Malaysia
American international schools in Asia
Educational institutions established in 1994
1994 establishments in Malaysia
Malaysia–United States relations